The Salomon Islands or Salomon Atoll is a small atoll of the Chagos Archipelago, British Indian Ocean Territory.

Description
The atoll is located in the northeast of the Chagos Archipelago, between Blenheim Reef and Peros Banhos. The remaining islets are much smaller.

There is a passage into the lagoon, named Baie de Salomon, on the Northern side, between Île Anglaise and Île de la Passe. The Salomon Islands are one of the favorite anchoring spots for itinerant yachtsmen passing through the Chagos, even though there are no proper moorings for yachts and a permit of the BIOT authorities is needed. Now uninhabited, the islands are overrun by low jungle between the coconut trees and it is hard to find the traces of the former settlements.

History
This atoll was settled in the last half of the 18th century by coconut plantation workers from Isle de France (now Mauritius). Little is known about the condition of the workers who were mostly of African origin. Most probably they lived in conditions close to slavery. The company exploiting the plantation was called the Chagos Agalega Company.

The Salomon Islands were surveyed in 1837 by Commander Robert Moresby of the Indian Navy on HMS Benares. Moresby's survey produced the first detailed map of this atoll. Some of the Salomon Islands were inhabited by the Chagossians, but at the time that the British Government decided to empty the Chagos of local inhabitants only Île Boddam was inhabited.

Between 1967 and 1973, 500 inhabitants of the Salomon Islands were illegally evicted by the British and their pets were killed in gas chambers by Sir Bruce Greatbatch in order to make way for an American military base. The evictees were resettled in Mauritius and Seychelles. Île Boddam had a jetty, shops, offices, a school, a church and a villa where the plantation manager lived. All these buildings are now hidden by thick jungle. There are wells on Boddam and Takamaka islands which are still used by yachtsmen to replenish their supplies.

Islets 
The individual islets of the atoll are, starting in the North, clockwise:

Île de la Passe
Île Mapou
Île Takamaka
Île Fouquet
Île Sepulture
Île Jacobin
Île du Sel
Île Poule
Île Boddam
Île Diable
Île Anglaise

References

External links 

Map of Salomon Islands
Chagos Archipelago

Atolls of the Chagos Archipelago
Former populated places in the Indian Ocean